Clavus aenigmaticus is a species of sea snail, a marine gastropod mollusk in the family Drilliidae.

Description

Distribution
This is a marine species endemic to Australia and occurring off Western Australia

References

 Wells, F.E. 1991. A revision of the Recent Australian species of the turrid genera Clavus, Plagiostropha, and Tylotiella (Mollusca: Gastropoda). Journal of the Malacological Society of Australasia 12: 1–33

External links

aenigmaticus
Gastropods of Australia
Gastropods described in 1991